"Ain't Nothing Like the Real Thing" is a 1968 single released by American R&B/soul duo Marvin Gaye and Tammi Terrell, on the Tamla label in 1968. The B-side of the single is "Little Ole Boy, Little Ole Girl" from the duo's United LP. The first release off the duo's second album: You're All I Need, the song - written and produced by regular Gaye/Terrell collaborators Ashford & Simpson - became a hit within weeks of release eventually peaking at number 8 on the Billboard Hot 100 and number 1 on the Hot Soul Singles chart, the first of the duo's two number 1 R&B hits. In the UK "Ain't Nothing Like the Real Thing" reached number 34.

Cash Box called it "a potent ballad," saying that "Detroit backing puts a beat into the session" and praising the "splendid vocals."

"Ain't Nothing Like the Real Thing" is ranked as the 57th biggest US hit of 1968.

Chart performance

Weekly charts

Year-end charts

Personnel
 All lead vocals by Marvin Gaye and Tammi Terrell
 Background vocals by Nickolas Ashford and Valerie Simpson
 Produced by Ashford & Simpson
 Instrumentation by The Funk Brothers

Donny & Marie version

Donny Osmond and Marie Osmond, billed as Donny & Marie, remade "Ain't Nothing Like the Real Thing" for their November 1976 album release New Season, with the track having a concurrent single release to reach #21 on the Billboard Hot 100 in February 1977, also charting Adult Contemporary at #17.  It was also a chart hit in Canada, peaking at #26 on the pop chart and #11 on the AC chart.

Record World said that it "is their finest performance yet."

Chart performance

Other notable versions
Aretha Franklin remade the song for her 1974 album Let Me in Your Life.  It was issued as the album's third hit single that August. Franklin's version radically re-invents the upbeat Marvin Gaye/Tammi Terrell original as a deep soul ballad which Jon Landau of Rolling Stone dismissed as "misconceived (done too slowly)".  Billboard described it as being highlighted by "extremely powerful vocals."  "Ain't Nothing Like the Real Thing" reached #6 on the Billboard Soul chart, as well as #44 in Cash Box and #47 on the Billboard Hot 100, that fall.  It won Franklin the Best Female R&B Vocal Performance Grammy for 1974 marking Franklin's eighth total and consecutive win in that category and her last such win until the Grammys for 1981.

Chris Christian remade the song in medley with another Marvin Gaye/Tammi Terrell hit "You're All I Need to Get By" for his Bob Gaudio-produced 1981 album: a duet with Amy Holland, the track "Ain't Nothing Like the Real Thing/ You're All I Need to Get By" had a single release in the summer of 1982 to reach #88 on Billboard Hot 100 also charting Adult Contemporary at #21. (Amy Holland's husband Michael McDonald would remake "Ain't Nothing Like the Real Thing" for his 2003 album Motown.) Christian's 1986 live album release Live At Six Flags features "Ain't Nothing Like the Real Thing" in medley with "Don't Worry Baby" and "I Go to Pieces".

English musician Elton John and American singer Marcella Detroit recorded the song for John's 1993 album Duets. After its inclusion on Detroit's album Jewel, the song was released as a single under London Records in May 1994, as the fourth and final song from Duets, and the second single from Jewel, with all B-sides, "Break the Chain" and "I Feel Free", performed solo by Detroit. Detroit and John's version peaked at number 24 on the UK Singles Chart for the week ending May 21, 1994.

Music critic David McGee of Rolling Stone named Vince Gill and Gladys Knight's recording of the song one of a couple "outright failures" of the 1994 ensemble album Rhythm, Country and Blues, criticizing Gill for "sound[ing] like a wimp [and] his soft, airy readings blown away by Knight's fierce delivery."

Music critic John J. Moser of The Morning Call praised Michael McDonald and Chaka Khan's duet performance of "Ain't Nothing like the Real Thing" at McDonald's June 25, 2019 live concert at Sands Bethlehem Event Center as "better" than their performance of "Ain't No Mountain High Enough" (also originally sung by Gaye and Terell), which Moser criticized as "an underwhelming mess of missed lyrics and timing."

References

External links
 
 

1967 songs
1968 singles
1969 singles
1970 singles
1972 singles
1974 singles
1976 singles
1994 singles
2003 singles
2007 singles
2008 singles
Aretha Franklin songs
Donny Osmond songs
Elton John songs
London Records singles
Male–female vocal duets
Marcella Detroit songs
Marie Osmond songs
Marvin Gaye songs
Polydor Records singles
Song recordings produced by Ashford & Simpson
Song recordings produced by Michael Lloyd
Song recordings produced by Mike Curb
Songs written by Nickolas Ashford
Songs written by Valerie Simpson
Tamla Records singles
Tammi Terrell songs
Vince Gill songs